Catalyst is a series of fantasy role-playing game supplements created by Flying Buffalo as a series of game aides that could be used with any medieval fantasy-themed role-playing game system.  The first supplement, Grimtooth's Traps, was released in 1981.  Numerous other Catalyst books were produced, including the Citybook series, seven Traps books, Treasure Vault, and the Lejentia campaign setting. The latest, City of the Gods Map Pack was produced in 2011.

Citybook I was the 1982 winner of the HG Wells Best Role Playing Adventure in 1982. Other Catalyst books have been nominees for the same award in later years.

Major contributors to the Catalyst books include Michael A. Stackpole, Liz Danforth, Steve Crompton, Ken St. Andre, Jennell Jaquays, Deb Wykle (aka Debora Kerr and Wynn Mercere), Rick Loomis, Larry DiTillio, and Bear Peters, along with many others.

Titles 

 Grimtooth's Traps
 Grimtooth's Traps Too
 Grimtooth's Traps Fore
 Grimtooth's Traps Ate
 Grimtooth's Traps Lite
 Grimtooth's Traps Bazarr
 Grimtooth's Dungeon of Doom
 The Wurst of Grimtooth's Traps (Published by Necromancer Games)
 Grimtooth's Ultimate Traps Collection (Published by Goodman Games)
 Citybook I: Butcher, Baker, Candlestick Maker
 Citybook II: Port O' Call
 Citybook III: Deadly Nightside
 Citybook IV: On the Road
 Citybook V: Sideshow
 Citybook VI: Up Town
 Citybook VII: King's River Bridge
 MAPS 1: Cities
 MAPS 2: Places of Legend
 City of the Gods: Forgotten Map Pack
 Lejentia Campaigns Book 1: Skully's Harbor
 Lejentia Campaigns Book 2: Fort Bevits
 Lejentia Adventure Pack
 Treasure Vault
 Wilderness Encounters

References

External links 

 Flying Buffalo's Catalyst homepage

Fantasy campaign settings
Fantasy role-playing game supplements
Flying Buffalo games